Wang Yumjie (born 29 July 1950) is a Chinese biathlete. He competed in the 20 km individual event at the 1980 Winter Olympics.

References

1950 births
Living people
Chinese male biathletes
Olympic biathletes of China
Biathletes at the 1980 Winter Olympics
Place of birth missing (living people)